Dr. K.V P Ramachandra Rao (fondly called as "KVP") (born 21 June 1948), is a Member of Parliament in India and chief adviser to the former chief minister of Andhra Pradesh Y. S. Rajasekhara Reddy. He belongs to Indian National Congress. He pressed for Y. S. Jagan Mohan Reddy to take on the post of Chief Minister.
After Bifurcation of Andhra Pradesh he is allotted to Telangana state by draw of lots.

Career
K.V P Ramachandra Rao, being a close friend of YS.Rajasekhara Reddy, was appointed as chief Advisor to Government of Andhra Pradesh on Public Affairs in cabinet rank in May 2004. He was elected to the Upper House of the Indian parliament, the Rajya Sabha in April 2008.

He is the chairman of the Advisory Committee on Public Affairs, Public Utilities and Public Welfare Activities.

On 2 April 2014, Rao was indicted by a US grand jury for his role in an international corruption scheme starting June 2006 involving bribery in the approval of mining contract with the Government of Andhra Pradesh. The indictment charges Rao with soliciting and distributing bribes for himself and to leaders of the Andhra Pradesh and Central Governments. The Indian National Congress led the ruling party in both the state and central governments between 2006 and February 2014 (in the state).

Personal life
K.V P Ramachandra Rao's parents are Father : Late. Sri K.V N Satyannarayana Rao and Mother : Srimati. Kotagiri Sita Devi. He married Suneetha and they have one son, Ujwal.

Positions held
 May 2004-March 2008 Advisor to Government of Andhra Pradesh on Public Affairs (Cabinet Rank)
 April 2008 Elected to Rajya Sabha
 August 2008 onwards Member, Committee on Finance.
 28 November 2010 Submitted his Resignation as advisor to Govt 
 Currently campaigning for Congress (I) .

References

External links
 Official website
 PRS-India Profile
 YSR Seva Sangam
 YSR Congress

1948 births
Living people
Indian National Congress politicians from Andhra Pradesh
Telugu politicians
People from Krishna district
Rajya Sabha members from Andhra Pradesh
Rajya Sabha members from Telangana